Glen Tuckett (December 11, 1927 – October 26, 2021) was the coach of the Brigham Young University (BYU) baseball team from 1959 to 1976 and then BYU athletic director from 1976 to 1994.

Tuckett was raised in Murray, Utah.  Tuckett played for the Salt Lake Bees and later for Salem's team.  Prior to coming to BYU Tuckett coached the Calvary Dodgers.  In 1995 Tuckett was appointed interim director of the University of Alabama athletic program in the wake of an NCAA investigation of violations in the program.  

After his retirement Tuckett was recognized with the Homer Rice Award.  In 2007, he was given the BYU Distinguished Service award.

Tuckett was a Latter-day Saint.

Sources

Additional sources
Mormon Times, April 20, 2010
Minor league stats for Tuckett
Deseret News, September 22, 1994
Deseret News, March 1, 1951
"People in the Church", Church News, September 16, 1995

1927 births
2021 deaths
Alabama Crimson Tide athletic directors
BYU Cougars athletic directors
BYU Cougars baseball coaches
People from Murray, Utah
American Latter Day Saints